Adel Iskandar (aka Adel Iskandar Farag) (born 15 March 1977) is a British-born Middle East media scholar, postcolonial theorist, analyst, and academic. He is the author and co-author of several works on Arab media, most prominently an analysis of the Arab satellite station Al Jazeera.

Born to an Egyptian family of physicians in Edinburgh, Scotland, he grew up in Kuwait, escaping the Iraqi invasion and the 1991 Persian Gulf War. At the age of 16, he moved to Canada where he earned his degree in Social Anthropology and Biology from Dalhousie University in Halifax, Nova Scotia. He later earned a masters in Communications from Purdue University Calumet in Hammond, Indiana and a PhD from the University of Kentucky.

He proposes the concept of "contextual objectivity" as a critique of media's coverage of war. He wrote a regular column for Egyptian independent newspaper Almasry Alyoum during and shortly after the revolution and taught in the Communication, Culture and Technology (CCT) program as well as the Center for Contemporary Arab Studies (CCAS) at Georgetown University.

He is currently teaches Global Communication at Simon Fraser University in Canada and is a co-editor of e-zine Jadaliyya.

Works
Author: Egypt In Flux: Essays on an Unfinished Revolution (forthcoming, 2013)
Co-editor: Mediating the Arab Uprisings (2012) Tadween Publishing.
Co-editor: Edward Said: A Legacy of Emancipation and Representation (2010), 
Co-editor: "Media Evolution on the Eve of the Arab Spring (2014)" Palgrave Macmillan, 
Co-author: Al-Jazeera: The Story of the Network that is Rattling Governments and Redefining Modern Journalism (2003),

References

External links
"Adel Iskandar", Egypt Independent
From Paris to Cairo: Resistance of the Unacculturated
Is Al-Jazeera Alternative? Mainstreaming Alterity and Assimilating Discourses of Dissent
Lines in the Sand: Problematizing Arab Media in the Post-Taxonomic Era
Edward Said: A Legacy of Emancipation and Representation

1977 births
Academics from Edinburgh
British mass media scholars
Scottish people of Egyptian descent
Egyptian writers
Dalhousie University alumni
Kuwaiti writers
Living people
University of Kentucky alumni
Purdue University alumni
Georgetown University faculty